Sant'Antonio di Gallura (Gallurese: Sant' Antòni) is a municipality in the Province of Sassari in the Italian region Sardinia, located about  north of Cagliari and about  northwest of Olbia.  Sant'Antonio di Gallura borders the following municipalities: Arzachena, Calangianus, Luras, Olbia, Telti.
 
The economy is based on agriculture, animal husbandry and production of cork. People move seasonally to the nearby Arzachena and Olbia to work in touristic structures.

References

External links
Official website 

Cities and towns in Sardinia
1979 establishments in Italy
States and territories established in 1979